Meimuna opalifera known in Japan as  due to its song, is a cicada. In Japan, it emerges in July and is no longer seen by about October.

Distribution
Meimuna opalifera is found in China, Japan, the Korean Peninsula, and Taiwan.

Description
Male Meimuna opalifera grow to a size of about 42 to 46 mm, while females reach a size of about 40 to 44 mm.

Life Cycle
Their median life cycle from egg to natural adult death is around two years. However, their life cycle can range from two years to five years.

References

External links 
 

 

 

Insects described in 1850
Cicadidae